Sholakkorgan is a settlement and the administrative center of Sozak District in Turkistan Region of Kazakhstan. It is the head of the Sholakkorgan rural district (KATO code - 515630100). Population:

Geography
Sholakkorgan lies north of the Karatau Mountains,  to the northeast of Turkistan city.

References

Populated places in Turkistan Region

ru:Шолаккорган